Antonio is a masculine given name of Etruscan origin deriving from the root name Antonius. It is a common name among Romance language–speaking populations as well as the Balkans and Lusophone Africa. It has been among the top 400 most popular male baby names in the United States since the late 19th century and has been among the top 200 since the mid 20th century.

In the English language it is translated as Anthony, and has some female derivatives: Antonia, Antónia, Antonieta, Antonietta, and Antonella'. It also has some male derivatives, such as Anthonio, Antón, Antò, Antonis, Antoñito, Antonino, Antonello, Tonio, Tono, Toño, Toñín, Tonino, Nantonio, Ninni, Totò, Tó, Tonini, Tony, Toni, Toninho, Toñito, and Tõnis. The Portuguese equivalent is António (Portuguese orthography) or Antônio (Brazilian Portuguese). In old Portuguese the form Antão was also used, not just to differentiate between older and younger but also between more and less important. In Galician the form is Antón, in Catalan Antò, and in Basque Antxon. The Greek versions of the name are Antonios (Αντώνιος) and Antonis (Αντώνης).

The name derives from Antonius, a well-known Latin family name, probably of Etruscan origin. The Roman general Marcus Antonius held that the origin of the name was Anthon (Ανθών), son of Hercules. This myth, recorded by Plutarch, was probably created by Marcus Antonius himself, in order to claim divine parentage. The name was in use throughout the Roman world which, at its height, comprised the whole of the Mediterranean and much of Europe as well as the Middle East. When the Roman Empire became Christian, the name continued in popularity because of the many great saints who bore the name. Later, the name was spread all around the world as Christianity was introduced to other locations (e.g. the Far East, the Americas, Australia, and Sub-Saharan Africa).

Famous male bearers

Antonio

Antonio Abetti, Italian astronomer
Antonio Abondio, Italian sculptor
Antonio Aguilar, Mexican singer
Antonio Azara, Italian jurist and politician
Antonio Bamboccio, Italian painter and sculptor
Antonio Banderas, Spanish actor 
Antonio Rafael Barceló, Puerto Rican politician
Antonio Bassolino, Italian politician
Antonio Barolini, Italian writer
Antonio Barreto, Sri Lankan Sinhala Karava soldier who gained the title "Prince of Uva" under the name Kuruvita Rala in the Kingdom of Kandy
Antonio Bazzini, Italian violinist and composer
Antonio di Benedetto, Argentine writer
Antonio Beretta, first mayor of Milan under the Kingdom of Italy from 1860 to 1867
 Antonio Blakeney (born 1996), American basketball player in the Israeli Basketball Premier League
Antonio Bonazza, Italian sculptor
Antonio Bosio, Italian scholar
Antonio Broccoli Porto, Puerto Rican artist
Antonio Brown, American football player
Antonio Bartolomeo Bruni, Italian violist, composer and conductor
Antonio Cabán Vale, Puerto Rican singer
Antonio Caldara, Italian composer
Antonio Callaway, American football player
Antonio Canaletto, Italian painter
Antonio Candreva, Italian footballer
Antonio Canova, Italian sculptor
Antonio Benedetto Carpano,  Italian distiller, famous for having invented the Vermouth and consequently the apéritif
Antonio Marziale Carracci, Italian painter
Antonio Cassano, Italian footballer
Antonio Cavallucci, Italian painter
Antonio Cermeño, Venezuelan boxer
Antonio Cervantes, Colombian boxer
Antonio Citterio, Italian furniture designer
Antonio Conte, Italian former footballer
Antonio Corradini, Italian sculptor
Antonio Correa Cotto, Puerto Rican criminal
Antonio da Correggio, Italian painter
Antonio Corti, Argentine boxer
António Costa, Portuguese Prime Minister.
Antonio Davis, US Basketball player
Antonio Di Natale, Italian footballer
Antonio Dixon, American football player
Antonio Donnarumma, Italian footballer
Antonio de La Gándara, painter
Antonio de la Rúa, former first son of Argentina
Antonio de Nigris (1978–2009), Mexican footballer
Antonio Escobar (disambiguation)
Antonio Esparragoza, Venezuelan boxer
Antonio Falzon, Maltese military engineer
António Félix da Costa, Portuguese racing driver and Formula E champion
Antonio Ferreira de Oliveira Junior, Brazilian soccer player
Antonio Floro Flores, Italian footballer
Antonio Fogazzaro, Italian novelist
Antonio Gamoneda, Spanish poet
Antonio Gandy-Golden (born 1998), American football player
Antonio Garay (born 1979), American NFL football player
Antonio Garcia (American football), American football player
Antonio Gibson (born 1998), American football running back
Antonio Gibson (safety) (born 1962), American football safety
Antonio Giovinazzi, Italian racing driver
Antonio González (martyr), Spanish Roman Catholic martyr and saint
Antonio Gates, American player of American football
Antonio Gherardi, Italian painter, architect, and sculptor
Antonio Ghislieri, better known as Pope Pius V
Antonio Gramsci, Italian writer, politician and political theorist
Antonio Guidi, Italian politician
Antonio Guzmán Blanco, former Venezuelan president
Antonio Hernández (disambiguation)
Antonio Indjai, Guinea-Bissau's army chief of staff and one of the leaders who orchestrated a coup in the country on 1 April 2010
Antonio Inoki, Japanese wrestler
Antonio Janigro, Italian cellist and conductor
Antônio Carlos Jobim, Brazilian creator of the bossa nova
Antonio Langella, Italian footballer
Antonio Latimer, Puerto Rican basketball player
Antonino Lo Surdo (1880–1949), Italian physicist and co-discoverer of the Stark effect
Antonio Lombardo, Italian sculptor
Antonio Lopez, United States illustrator who signed his work "Antonio." 
Antonio Lotti, Italian composer
Antonio Luna, Filipino Revolutionary Army and General of The Philippine Revolutionary in The First Philippine Republic
Antonio Maccanico, Italian politician
Antonio Maceo Grajales, Cuban general
Antonio Machado, Spanish poet
Antonio Mancini, Italian painter
Antonio Manetti, Italian mathematician and architect
Antonio Margarito, American boxer
Antonio Martini, Italian Biblical scholar and Archbishop of Florence
Antonio Martino, Italian politician
Antonio Marzano, Italian politician
Antonio McDyess, United States basketball player
Antonio Tobias Mendez, American sculptor
Antônio Meneses, Brazilian cellist
Antonio Meucci, Italian-American inventor
Antonio Monda, Italian film director
António Monteiro, Portuguese diplomat 
Antonio Mosconi, Italian politician
António Mota, Portuguese trader and explorer
Antonio Narcisse, American football player
Antonio Nariño, Colombian ideologist and politician
Antonio Negri, Italian philosopher
Antonio Nocerino, Italian footballer
Antônio Rodrigo Nogueira and his brother Antônio Rogério Nogueira, both Brazilian mixed martial artists
Antonio Pantojas, Puerto Rican actor
Antonio Paoli, Puerto Rican opera singer
Antonio Pappano, British conductor
Antonio S. Pedreira, Puerto Rican poet
Antonio Pigafetta, Italian explorer
Antonio Pignatelli, better known as Pope Innocent XII
Antonio del Pollaiuolo, Italian painter
Antonio Prieto, Spanish long-distance runner
Antonio Puerta, Spanish international footballer
Antonio Raul Corbo, American child actor
Antonio de los Reyes Correa, Puerto Rican military hero
Antonio Rivera, Puerto Rican boxer
Antonio Rodríguez Balinas, Puerto Rican US Army General
Antonio Rosmini-Serbati, Italian philosopher
Antonio Rossi, Italian canoer
Antonio Roybal, Spanish American painter
Antonio Rüdiger, German footballer 
Antonio Ruiz Soler, Flamenco dancer (known as "Antonio")
Antonio Rukavina, Serbian footballer
Antonio Sabàto Jr., Italian-American model and actor
Antonio Sacchini, Italian composer
António de Oliveira Salazar, Portuguese statesman and prime minister
Antonio Salieri, Austrian Court Composer, famous "mediocre" rival of Mozart
António Salvador, Portuguese long-distance runner
Antonio Sánchez, Mexican musician
Antonio Sánchez, Puerto Rican show host
Antonio Sciortino, Maltese sculptor
Antonio Segni, Italian politician
Antonio Semini, Italian painter
Antonio Silio, Argentine long-distance runner
Antonio Starabba, Marchese di Rudinì, Prime Minister of Italy between 1891 and 1892 and from 1896 until 1898
Antonio Stradivari, Italian luthier
Antonio Tabucchi, Italian writer
Antonio Taguba, a Filipino-American retired major general of the US army
Antonio Tarver, United States boxer
Antonio Travi, Italian painter
Antonio Valero de Bernabé, Puerto Rican, helped Simón Bolívar liberate South America
Antonio Maria Maraggiano, Italian sculptor
Antonio Maria Vassallo, Italian painter
Antonio Valencia, Ecuadorian footballer
Antonio Vivaldi, Italian composer
Antonio Zarro, Academy Award-winning Italian screenwriter

Anthonio Makau, Kenyan Jigsaw Puzzle Company entrepreneur
Antonio may also refer to:
The Great Antonio, Canadian strongman, professional wrestler, and actor
Antonio (singer), Jamaican reggae singer born Maurice Silvera

Antonio as middle name
Carlo Antonio Buffagnotti, Italian painter
Carlo Antonio Tavella, Italian painter
Eugene Antonio Marino, first African American archbishop in the United States
Francesco Antonio Franzoni, Italian sculptor
Giacomo Antonio Arland, Italian painter
Gioachino Antonio Rossini, Italian composer
Giovanni Antonio Amadeo, Italian sculptor
Giovanni Antonio Dosio, Italian architect and sculptor
Giovanni Antonio Facchinetti, better known as Pope Innocent IX
Giovanni Antonio Pellegrini, Italian painter
Giovanni Antonio Scopoli, Italian-Austrian physician and naturalist
José Antonio Bowen, American jazz musician and president of Goucher College
José Antonio de la Garza, Mexican-American politician
Juan Antonio Marichal, Dominican baseball player
Luis Antonio Tagle, Filipino cardinal and current prefect of the Congregation for the Evangelization of Peoples
Antonio Valencia, Ecuadorian footballer
Marco Antonio Barrera, Mexican boxer
Marco Antonio Etcheverry, Bolivian soccer player
Marco Antonio Muñiz, Mexican singer
Marco Antonio Muñiz, Puerto Rican singer, better known as Mark Anthony, named after the Mexican singer
Marco Antonio Regil, Mexican show host
Marco Antonio Solís, Mexican singer
Niccolò Antonio Zingarelli, Italian composer
Tomaso Antonio Vitali, Italian composer

Known as Tony

Tony Álvarez, Major League Baseball center fielder
Tony Alvarez (singer), Cuban singer
Tony Alvarez (actor), Spanish-Australian actor
Tony Ayala Jr., Mexican-American boxer
Tony Baltazar, Mexican-American boxer
Tony Campos, Mexican-American musician
Tony Danza, Italian-American boxer and actor
Tony Fratto, Deputy Press Secretary
Tony Parker, French basketball player
Tony Plana, Cuban actor
Tony Romo, American football quarterback
Tony Sanchez (disambiguation), multiple people
Tony Vega, Puerto Rican singer
Tony Peña, retired Major League Baseball player
Tony Pérez, Hall of Fame Major League Baseball player

Fictional characters

Antonio may refer to the fictional characters:
, the given human name for the personification of Spain from the anime series Hetalia: Axis Powers
Antonio Garcia, a character in the television show Power Rangers: Samurai
Antonio (The Merchant of Venice), the title character in Shakespeare's The Merchant of Venice
Antonio, a character in Shakespeare's Much Ado About Nothing
Antonio, a character in Shakespeare's The Tempest
Antonio, a character in Shakespeare's Twelfth Night
Antonio, a hunter in the video game Identity V
Antonio Bologna, a character in Webster's The Duchess of Malfi
Antonio, a character on the television show Monster Warriors 
Tony Montana, the main character in the film Scarface (1983 film)
Antonio, an anteater villager in the Animal Crossing series
Antonio, a character in the video game Assassin's Creed II
Antonio the male otter, a character in the animated TV show The Penguins of Madagascar
Antonio, one of the scarlet macaw players in the Pit of Doom in Rio 2
Antonio “Tony” Padilla, a character in the novel and Netflix series 13 Reasons Why
Antonio, the protagonist's father in the movie Nahuel and the Magic Book
Antonio Madrigal, a character in Encanto

Other uses
 Antonino, Kansas, a community in the United States
MV Antonios, a number of motor vessels with this or a similar name
 "Oh! Oh! Antonio!" music-hall song performed by Florrie Forde
 San Antonio, second largest city in Texas

Surnames
Carlos Antonio
Ebony Antonio (born 1991), female Australian rules footballer 
Lou Antonio (born 1934), American actor and director
Michail Antonio (born 1990) is an English professional footballer 
Pablo Antonio (1901–1975), Filipino architect

See also

Antonic
Antonijo
Antonik
Antonin (name)
Antonino (name)
Antonios, name
Antoñito (name)
Antoniu
Antono (name)
Entonio Pashaj

References

Bosnian, Catalan, Croatian, Galician, Italian, Portuguese, Romanian, and Spanish

Bosnian masculine given names
Catalan masculine given names
Croatian masculine given names
Galician masculine given names
Italian masculine given names
Portuguese masculine given names
Romanian masculine given names
Spanish masculine given names
Sammarinese given names